Daughn Gibson (born Josh Martin, 1981) is an American singer-songwriter from Carlisle, Pennsylvania. He was formerly the drummer for Pearls and Brass. His debut album, All Hell, was released in 2012. The album received an 8.1/10 review from Pitchfork Media, as well as an 8.6/10 review from Playground.

In 2013 he released another album, Me Moan, with Sub Pop.

On June 2, 2015, he released his third album, Carnation, also with Sub Pop.

In June of 2022, he self-released a six-song EP named Kriminelle Energie, available only on Bandcamp, his first new music since the 2016 EP Vas 1.

Discography

Albums
All Hell (2012, White Denim)
Me Moan (2013, Sub Pop)
Carnation (2015, Sub Pop)

References

External links

Harrowing small-town tales from a Pennsylvania punk-turned-crooner.
New band of the day

1981 births
Living people
American male singer-songwriters
American heavy metal drummers
People from Carlisle, Pennsylvania
Singer-songwriters from Pennsylvania
21st-century American singers
21st-century American drummers
21st-century American male singers